"Helium" is a song recorded by Australian singer-songwriter Sia for the Fifty Shades Darker soundtrack. The soundtrack was released in support of the 2017 film Fifty Shades Darker, an adaptation of the novel of the same name from the Fifty Shades trilogy. Sia wrote the song with frequent collaborator Chris Braide; Braide produced the song with Oliver Kraus. A remix of the song with David Guetta and Afrojack was released as a standalone single on 25 January 2018.

Track listing
Digital download - album track
"Helium" – 4:12

Digital download - remix
"Helium" (Sia vs. David Guetta and Afrojack) – 3:57

Personnel
Adapted from Tidal.

Chris Braide - composer, producer
Brad Haehnel - mixer
Oliver Kraus - producer
Sia - composer

Charts

Certifications

References

2018 singles
2016 songs
Fifty Shades film music
Sia (musician) songs
David Guetta songs
Afrojack songs
Songs written by Sia (musician)
Future bass songs
Songs written by Chris Braide
2017 songs
2018 songs
Song recordings produced by David Guetta